Elevator Baby is a 2019 Nigerian drama thriller film directed by Akay Mason and produced by Niyi Akinmolayan. It was produced by Niyi's production company Anthill Studios, and stars Toyin Abraham, Timini Egbuson, Sambasa Nzeribe, Samuel Olatunji, Emem Ufot and Shafy Bello. Elevator Baby was listed among the highest-grossing Nigerian films of 2019.

Plot
Dare (Timini Egbuson) is a wealthy, entitled and unemployed engineering graduate whose father was killed in a vehicular accident. He drinks, spends time with his jobless friends, and is unthankful for his mother's financial support. On his way to a job interview, he enters a lift with Abigail (Toyin Abraham), a poor and pregnant domestic worker. Following a power failure, the lift stops and Abigail goes into labour. He helped her during labour and this experience made him change his lifestyle.

Cast 
Toyin Abraham as Abigail
Timini Egbuson as Dare
Shafy Bello as Mrs Williams
 Yemi Solade as Doctor
Sambasa Nzeribe as Stevo
Samuel A. Perry (Broda Shaggi) as Taju
Emem Ufot as Jide
 Ijeoma Aniebo as Nana
 Blessing Onwukwe as Madam
 Blessing Obasi as Secretary

Reception 
Elevator Baby received positive reviews from some film critics. It was praised for its cinematography, lighting and the acting of Abraham and Egbuson. Nollywood Reinvented highlighted Timini's performance struggles and praised Abraham's ability to carry the movie, stating that the movie was fun to watch. An Afrocritik review scored the movie 6.2/10 noting that the storyline is not captivating as the movie struggles to reach the finish line and is only saved by the performances of the actors.

References

2019 films
English-language Nigerian films
Nigerian thriller drama films
2019 thriller drama films
2010s English-language films